The Priory Academy LSST (formerly the Lincoln School of Science and Technology) is a co-educational partially-selective academy school and teaching school situated on Cross O'Cliff Hill, Lincoln, Lincolnshire, England. It specialises in science, technology and teaching, and is the lead school of the Lincolnshire Teaching Schools Alliance. It is also the lead member of The Priory Federation of Academies.

The Priory Academy LSST is the most over-subscribed school in Lincolnshire, the largest school on a single site in the county and one of the most popular of its kind in the country. It is the only school in the UK with its own digital planetarium.

History
The school is on the site of South Park High School, which had originally opened in May 1922 as an all-girls grammar school (South Park Girls' Grammar School) for the south of the city. New buildings were added in October 1938 and extensions in 1962 and between 1974 and 1977. It became co-educational in September 1974. The school was closed on 27 July 1989 due to falling numbers. South Park had been originally intended for 200 pupils, however, by the time it closed its size had reached 900.

The school was reopened as The Lincoln School of Science and Technology in September 1992, admitting only year seven pupils in its first year, growing in size each year as a new year group joined. Its name changed at the end of 1999 to The Priory LSST, after the nearby St. Katherine's Priory.

In 2008, the school transferred to academy status under the newly formed Priory Federation of Academies, changing to its current name, The Priory Academy LSST.

Performance
As of 2020, the school's most recent Ofsted inspection was in 2010, with the outcome of Outstanding.

In 2015 the Department for Education stated that the school had an 89% GCSE A*-C pass rate, a fall of 10% from 2013 (including English and Maths). This made it the 15th most successful school at GCSE level in the Lincolnshire Learning Authority  and the top-performing school in Lincoln.

The school's Progress 8 score at GCSE in 2019 was average. The percentage of pupils entered for the English Baccalaureate was very high. The percentage of pupils attaining grade 5 or above in both English and maths GCSEs was 65%, compared to the England average of 43%.

Headteachers

The current Headteacher is Jane Hopkinson, who is also Deputy CEO of the Federation. She is a former Deputy Headteacher at the academy and Director of Student Standards for the Federation. She was also previously the Headteacher of The Priory City of Lincoln Academy before assuming the headship of LSST in September 2016, following the departure of Ian Jones to the singular role of CEO of the Federation, having previously combined the two roles.

Campus

St.  Katherine's Site

On the main academy site there is a central garden known as the Quad, in addition to a number of individual gardens for the use of specific year groups. There are also three courts situated at the front of the school, used by year nine, ten and eleven pupils at break and lunchtime, and as a car park following the end of the school day. The main academy site is also the location of the 'Old Hall', where the school holds events including the annual theatre production and talent show.

Attached to the original school buildings is the academy's Department of Technology, which is based around a central concourse housing a laser cutting machine. There are workshops for woodwork, cookery, electronics, textiles, engineering and product design, as well as a robotics lab (The Mackinder Lab) opened in 2015 by MARC (Multi-Actuated Robotic Companion) from the University of Lincoln.

Newark Road site

The main site is linked to the other side of the academy by a large, covered walkway, alongside which there is the Swimming Pool, Boathouse, Pavilion (containing a study room, and the Department of Psychology), year eleven garden, and a non-denominational chapel which stands alongside the academy's own version of the Chartres Labyrinth. There are separate blocks housing the Department of Religious Education, Department of History, Department of Geography (Rawson Geography Centre) and Department of Music (which contains a sound-proofed recording studio).

At the end of the walkway, there is another building which houses the Departments of English, Drama and Art. The New Hall is also situated in this building, alongside the lecture theatre, gallery and a reception area for sixth form students.  Just outside this building is a food outlet known as 'The Shed' and a shooting range for the use of the academy's Combined Cadet Force.

Newton Centre

Officially opened on 29 June 2011, the Newton Centre is a Sixth Form science centre on the academy campus, accessible from a separate walkway that leads from behind the Rawson Geography Centre. The Newton Centre contains a planetarium, laboratories and the Gagarin Debating Chamber.

The Priory Sports Centre
Facilities in the £8m centre include a 400m synthetic Olympic-standard running track outside the Sports Centre, and a 60m indoor running track integrated with a multipurpose sports hall. There are classrooms and a state of the art gymnasium, available for use by students during PE lessons and outside school hours through Priory Leisure. On 15 October 2013, The Priory Sports Centre was officially opened by Sir Matthew Pinsent CBE. There is also a rugby pitch situated on a grass bank above the running track, as well as a large field used for PE lessons and other sports events. Within the running track, there are areas for shot put, javelin and hammer throw. There is also a long-jump pit.

Robert de Cheney Boarding House
The Robert de Cheney Boarding House was opened in 2011 and closed in 2020 owing to the combined impact of Brexit and the COVID-19 pandemic on its financial sustainability. The former Boarding Houses' building is located adjacent to the Sports Centre. The academy was one of only 40 state boarding schools in England. The majority of boarding pupils were from abroad, with significant numbers from the Czech Republic, Spain, China and the Middle East. It had 60 full-time boarding places in single, ensuite study bedrooms, and was given an outstanding rating by Ofsted in 2014.

Curriculum
Pupils undergo an accelerated curriculum at Key Stage 3, and begin their GCSE courses in all subjects in Year 9.

Sixth form

The school has a Sixth Form of around 540 pupils. With the introduction of new, linear A Levels (with examinations taking place at the end of the course), students now study three subjects for the two years, with some limited scope for students to take a fourth subject, as well as the opportunity to undertake an Extended Project Qualification.

Sixth Form students are able to study vocational or occupational courses at the federation's two other schools in Lincoln with sixth form provision, The Priory City of Lincoln Academy and The Priory Witham Academy. In the same way, students from those schools may study some subjects at LSST that their school does not have the capacity to offer. For example, all students studying A Levels in science subjects at the other two academy sixth forms in Lincoln take lessons at LSST.

The LSST Alumni Association

The Academy established an Alumni Association in 2019.

See also
 Priory City of Lincoln Academy
 The Priory Ruskin Academy
 Priory Witham Academy
 St Catherine's Priory, Lincoln

References

External links
 Priory LSST website
 BBC News information page on The Priory LSST
 Academy head quit over cash probe

Secondary schools in Lincolnshire
Training schools in England
Schools in Lincoln, England
Academies in Lincolnshire